Lorton station is a railroad station located at 8990 Lorton Station Boulevard in Lorton, Virginia. It is served by the Virginia Railway Express Fredericksburg Line. This station is one mile north from Amtrak's Lorton station, the northern terminus of the Auto Train. Amtrak's Northeast Regional, Silver Meteor, Silver Star, Palmetto, and Carolinian trains share the line but do not stop at either Lorton station.

The station opened in 1994, two years after VRE began service, as an infill station.

An extension to the platform was completed in 2017 to accommodate direct passenger access to all entry on 8 car trains.  The platform extension officially opened on December 11, 2017, with a ribbon cutting ceremony for this improvement held on March 8, 2018.

Future work at the station will include a second platform and pedestrian overpass to accommodate construction of the fourth track by DRPT.  On July 2, 2020, this project was cancelled by the Northern Virginia Transportation Authority (NVTA) and deferred until 4th track construction.

References

External links
Lorton Station (VRE)

Virginia Railway Express stations
Transportation in Fairfax County, Virginia
Buildings and structures in Fairfax County, Virginia
Railway stations in the United States opened in 1994